The East India Company (EIC) was an English, and later British, joint-stock company founded in 1600 and dissolved in 1874. It was formed to trade in the Indian Ocean region, initially with the East Indies (the Indian subcontinent and Southeast Asia), and later with East Asia. The company seized control of large parts of the Indian subcontinent, colonised parts of Southeast Asia and Hong Kong. At its peak, the company was the largest corporation in the world. The EIC had its own armed forces in the form of the company's three Presidency armies, totalling about 260,000 soldiers, twice the size of the British army at the time. The operations of the company had a profound effect on the global balance of trade, almost single-handedly reversing the trend of eastward drain of Western bullion, seen since Roman times.

Originally chartered as the "Governor and Company of Merchants of London Trading into the East-Indies", the company rose to account for half of the world's trade during the mid-1700s and early 1800s, particularly in basic commodities including cotton, silk, indigo dye, sugar, salt, spices, saltpetre, tea, and opium. The company also ruled the beginnings of the British Empire in India.

The company eventually came to rule large areas of India, exercising military power and assuming administrative functions. Company rule in India effectively began in 1757 after the Battle of Plassey and lasted until 1858. Following the Indian Rebellion of 1857, the Government of India Act 1858 led to the British Crown assuming direct control of India in the form of the new British Raj.

Despite frequent government intervention, the company had recurring problems with its finances. The company was dissolved in 1874 as a result of the East India Stock Dividend Redemption Act enacted one year earlier, as the Government of India Act had by then rendered it vestigial, powerless, and obsolete. The official government machinery of the British Raj had assumed its governmental functions and absorbed its armies.

Origins 

In 1577, Francis Drake set out on an expedition from England to plunder Spanish settlements in South America in search of gold and silver. Sailing in the Golden Hind he achieved this, and then sailed across the Pacific Ocean in 1579, known then only to the Spanish and Portuguese. Drake eventually sailed into the East Indies and came across the Moluccas, also known as the Spice Islands, and met Sultan Babullah. In exchange for linen, gold and silver, a large haul of exotic spices including cloves and nutmeg were obtained – the English initially not realising their huge value. Drake returned to England in 1580 and became a hero; his circumnavigation raised an enormous amount of money for England's coffers, and investors received a return of some 5,000 percent. Thus started an important element in the eastern design during the late sixteenth century.

Soon after the defeat of the Spanish Armada in 1588, the captured Spanish and Portuguese ships and cargoes enabled English voyagers to travel the globe in search of riches. London merchants presented a petition to Queen Elizabeth I for permission to sail to the Indian Ocean. The aim was to deliver a decisive blow to the Spanish and Portuguese monopoly of far-eastern trade. Having sailed around Cape Comorin to the Malay Peninsula, they preyed on Spanish and Portuguese ships there before returning to England in 1594.

The biggest prize that galvanised English trade was the seizure of a large Portuguese carrack, the Madre de Deus, by Sir Walter Raleigh and the Earl of Cumberland at the Battle of Flores on 13 August 1592. When she was brought in to Dartmouth she was the largest vessel ever seen in England and she carried chests of jewels, pearls, gold, silver coins, ambergris, cloth, tapestries, pepper, cloves, cinnamon, nutmeg, benjamin (a tree that produces frankincense), red dye, cochineal and ebony. Equally valuable was the ship's rutter (mariner's handbook) containing vital information on the China, India, and Japan trade routes.

In 1596, three more English ships sailed east but all were lost at sea. A year later however saw the arrival of Ralph Fitch, an adventurer merchant who, with his companions, had made a remarkable fifteen-year overland journey to Mesopotamia, the Persian Gulf, the Indian Ocean, India and Southeast Asia. Fitch was consulted on Indian affairs and gave even more valuable information to Lancaster.

Formation 
In 1599, a group of prominent merchants and explorers met to discuss a potential East Indies venture under a royal charter. Besides Fitch and Lancaster, the group included Stephen Soame, then Lord Mayor of London; Thomas Smythe, a powerful London politician and administrator, whose father had established the Levant Company; Sir John Wolstenholme; Richard Hakluyt, writer and apologist for British colonization of the Americas; and several other sea-farers who had served with Drake and Raleigh.

On 22 September, the group stated their intention "to venture in the pretended voyage to the East Indies (the which it may please the Lord to prosper)" and to themselves invest £30,133 (over £4,000,000 in today's money). Two days later, the "Adventurers" reconvened and resolved to apply to the Queen for support of the project. Although their first attempt had not been completely successful, they sought the Queen's unofficial approval to continue. They bought ships for the venture and increased their investment to £68,373.

They convened again a year later, on 31 December 1600, and this time they succeeded; the Queen, responded favourably to a petition by "George, Earl of Cumberland and 218 others, including James Lancaster, Sir John Harte, Sir John Spencer (both of whom had been Lord Mayor of London), the adventurer Edward Michelborne, the nobleman William Cavendish and other Aldermen and citizens. She granted her charter to their corporation named Governor and Company of Merchants of London trading into the East Indies. For a period of fifteen years, the charter awarded the company a monopoly on English trade with all countries east of the Cape of Good Hope and west of the Straits of Magellan. Any traders there without a licence from the company were liable to forfeiture of their ships and cargo (half of which would go to the Crown and half to the company), as well as imprisonment at the "royal pleasure".

The charter named Thomas Smythe as the first governor of the company, and 24 directors (including James Lancaster) or "committees", who made up a Court of Directors. They, in turn, reported to a Court of Proprietors, who appointed them. Ten committees reported to the Court of Directors. By tradition, business was initially transacted at the Nags Head Inn, opposite St Botolph's church in Bishopsgate, before moving to India House in Leadenhall Street.

Early voyages to the East Indies 
Sir James Lancaster commanded the first East India Company voyage in 1601 aboard . The following year whilst sailing in the Malacca Straits Lancaster took the rich 1,200 ton Portuguese carrack Sao Thome carrying pepper and spices. The booty enabled the voyagers to set up two "factories" – one at Bantam on Java and another in the Moluccas (Spice Islands) before leaving. They returned to England in 1603 to learn of Elizabeth's death but Lancaster was knighted by the new king, James I on account of the voyage's success. By this time, the war with Spain had ended but the company had profitably breached the Spanish-Portuguese duopoly; new horizons opened for the English.

In March 1604, Sir Henry Middleton commanded the second voyage. General William Keeling, a captain during the second voyage, led the third voyage aboard Red Dragon from 1607 to 1610 along with Hector under Captain William Hawkins and Consent under Captain David Middleton.

Early in 1608 Alexander Sharpeigh was made captain of the company's Ascension, and general or commander of the fourth voyage. Thereafter two ships, Ascension and Union (captained by Richard Rowles) sailed from Woolwich on 14 March 1608. This expedition would be lost.

Initially, the company struggled in the spice trade because of competition from the well-established Dutch East India Company. The English company opened a factory in Bantam on Java on its first voyage, and imports of pepper from Java remained an important part of the company's trade for twenty years. The Bantam factory closed in 1683.

English traders frequently fought their Dutch and Portuguese counterparts in the Indian Ocean. The company achieved a major victory over the Portuguese in the Battle of Swally in 1612, at Suvali in Surat. The company decided to explore the feasibility of a foothold in mainland India, with official sanction from both Britain and the Mughal Empire, and requested that the Crown launch a diplomatic mission.

Foothold in India 

Company ships docked at Surat in Gujarat in 1608. The company established its first Indian factory in 1615 at Surat, and its second in 1616 at Masulipatnam on the Andhra Coast of the Bay of Bengal. The high profits reported by the company after landing in India initially prompted James I to grant subsidiary licences to other trading companies in England. However, in 1609 he renewed the East India Company's charter for an indefinite period, with the proviso that its privileges would be annulled if trade was unprofitable for three consecutive years.

In 1615, James I instructed Sir Thomas Roe to visit the Mughal Emperor Nur-ud-din Salim Jahangir (r. 1605–1627) to arrange for a commercial treaty that would give the company exclusive rights to reside and establish factories in Surat and other areas. In return, the company offered to provide the Emperor with goods and rarities from the European market. This mission was highly successful, and Jahangir sent a letter to James through Sir Thomas Roe:

Expansion 

The company, which benefited from the imperial patronage, soon expanded its commercial trading operations. It eclipsed the Portuguese Estado da Índia, which had established bases in Goa, Chittagong, and Bombay – Portugal later ceded Bombay to England as part of the dowry of Catherine of Braganza on her marriage to King Charles II. The East India Company also launched a joint attack with the Dutch United East India Company (VOC) on Portuguese and Spanish ships off the coast of China that helped secure EIC ports in China, independently attacking the Portuguese in the Persian Gulf Residencies primarily for political reasons. The company established trading posts in Surat (1619) and Madras (1639). By 1647, the company had 23 factories and settlements in India, and 90 employees. The Crown turned Bombay over to the company in 1668, and the company established a presence in Calcutta in 1690. The major factories became the walled forts of Fort William in Bengal, Fort St George in Madras, and Bombay Castle.

In 1634, the Mughal emperor Shah Jahan extended his hospitality to the English traders to the region of Bengal, and in 1717 customs duties were completely waived for the English in Bengal. The company's mainstay businesses were by then cotton, silk, indigo dye, saltpetre, and tea. The Dutch were aggressive competitors and had meanwhile expanded their monopoly of the spice trade in the Straits of Malacca by ousting the Portuguese in 1640–1641. With reduced Portuguese and Spanish influence in the region, the EIC and VOC entered a period of intense competition, resulting in the Anglo-Dutch Wars of the 17th and 18th centuries.

Within the first two decades of the 17th century, the Dutch East India Company or Vereenigde Oostindische Compagnie, (VOC) was the wealthiest commercial operation in the world with 50,000 employees worldwide and a private fleet of 200 ships. It specialised in the spice trade and gave its shareholders 40% annual dividend.

The British East India Company was fiercely competitive with the Dutch and French throughout the 17th and 18th centuries over spices from the Spice Islands. Some spices, at the time, could only be found on these islands, such as nutmeg and cloves; and they could bring profits as high as 400 percent from one voyage.

The tension was so high between the Dutch and the British East Indies Trading Companies that it escalated into at least four Anglo-Dutch Wars: 1652–1654, 1665–1667, 1672–1674 and 1780–1784.

Competition arose in 1635 when Charles I granted a trading licence to Sir William Courteen, which permitted the rival Courteen association to trade with the east at any location in which the EIC had no presence.

In an act aimed at strengthening the power of the EIC, King Charles II granted the EIC (in a series of five acts around 1670) the rights to autonomous territorial acquisitions, to mint money, to command fortresses and troops and form alliances, to make war and peace, and to exercise both civil and criminal jurisdiction over the acquired areas.

In 1689 a Mughal fleet commanded by Sidi Yaqub attacked Bombay. After a year of resistance the EIC surrendered in 1690, and the company sent envoys to Aurangzeb's camp to plead for a pardon. The company's envoys had to prostrate themselves before the emperor, pay a large indemnity, and promise better behaviour in the future. The emperor withdrew his troops, and the company subsequently re-established itself in Bombay and set up a new base in Calcutta.

Slavery 1621–1834 

The East India Company's archives suggest its involvement in the slave trade began in 1684, when a Captain Robert Knox was ordered to buy and transport 250 slaves from Madagascar to St. Helena. The East India Company began using and transporting slaves in Asia and the Atlantic in the early 1620s, according to the Encyclopædia Britannica, or in 1621, according to Richard Allen. Eventually, the company ended the trade in 1834 after numerous legal threats from the British state and the Royal Navy in the form of the West Africa Squadron, which discovered various ships had contained evidence of the illegal trade.

Japan 

In 1613, during the rule of Tokugawa Hidetada of the Tokugawa shogunate, the British ship , under the command of Captain John Saris, was the first British ship to call on Japan. Saris was the chief factor of the EIC's trading post in Java, and with the assistance of William Adams, a British sailor who had arrived in Japan in 1600, he was able to gain permission from the ruler to establish a commercial house in Hirado on the Japanese island of Kyushu:

However, unable to obtain Japanese raw silk for export to China and with their trading area reduced to Hirado and Nagasaki from 1616 onwards, the company closed its factory in 1623.

Anglo-Mughal War 

The first of the Anglo-Indian Wars occurred in 1686 when the company conducted naval operations against Shaista Khan, the governor of Mughal Bengal. This led to the siege of Bombay and the subsequent intervention of the Mughal Emperor, Aurangzeb. Subsequently, the English company was defeated and fined.

Mughal convoy piracy incident of 1695 

The Mughal convoy included the treasure-laden Ganj-i-Sawai, reported to be the greatest in the Mughal fleet and the largest ship operational in the Indian Ocean, and its escort, the Fateh Muhammed. They were spotted passing the straits en route to Surat. The pirates gave chase and caught up with Fateh Muhammed some days later, and meeting little resistance, took some £50,000 to £60,000 worth of treasure.

Every continued in pursuit and managed to overhaul Ganj-i-Sawai, which resisted strongly before eventually striking. Ganj-i-Sawai carried enormous wealth and, according to contemporary East India Company sources, was carrying a relative of the Grand Mughal, though there is no evidence to suggest that it was his daughter and her retinue. The loot from the Ganj-i-Sawai had a total value between £325,000 and £600,000, including 500,000 gold and silver pieces, and has become known as the richest ship ever taken by pirates.

When the news arrived in England it caused an outcry. To appease Aurangzeb, the East India Company promised to pay all financial reparations, while Parliament declared the pirates hostis humani generis ("the enemy of humanity"). In mid-1696 the government issued a £500 bounty on Every's head and offered a free pardon to any informer who disclosed his whereabouts. When the East India Company later doubled that reward, the first worldwide manhunt in recorded history was underway.

The plunder of Aurangzeb's treasure ship had serious consequences for the English East India Company. The furious Mughal Emperor Aurangzeb ordered Sidi Yaqub and Nawab Daud Khan to attack and close four of the company's factories in India and imprison their officers, who were almost lynched by a mob of angry Mughals, blaming them for their countryman's depredations, and threatened to put an end to all English trading in India. To appease Emperor Aurangzeb and particularly his Grand Vizier Asad Khan, Parliament exempted Every from all of the Acts of Grace (pardons) and amnesties it would subsequently issue to other pirates.

Forming a complete monopoly

Trade monopoly 

The prosperity that the officers of the company enjoyed allowed them to return to Britain and establish sprawling estates and businesses, and to obtain political power. The company developed a lobby in the English parliament. Under pressure from ambitious tradesmen and former associates of the company (pejoratively termed Interlopers by the company), who wanted to establish private trading firms in India, a deregulating act was passed in 1694.

This allowed any English firm to trade with India, unless specifically prohibited by act of parliament, thereby annulling the charter that had been in force for almost 100 years. When the East India Company Act 1697 (9 Will. c. 44) was passed in 1697, a new "parallel" East India Company (officially titled the English Company Trading to the East Indies) was floated under a state-backed indemnity of £2 million. The powerful stockholders of the old company quickly subscribed a sum of £315,000 in the new concern, and dominated the new body. The two companies wrestled with each other for some time, both in England and in India, for a dominant share of the trade.

It quickly became evident that, in practice, the original company faced scarcely any measurable competition. The companies merged in 1708, by a tripartite indenture involving both companies and the state, with the charter and agreement for the new United Company of Merchants of England Trading to the East Indies being awarded by Sidney Godolphin, 1st Earl of Godolphin. Under this arrangement, the merged company lent to the Treasury a sum of £3,200,000, in return for exclusive privileges for the next three years, after which the situation was to be reviewed. The amalgamated company became the United Company of Merchants of England Trading to the East Indies.

In the following decades there was a constant battle between the company lobby and Parliament. The company sought a permanent establishment, while Parliament would not willingly allow it greater autonomy and so relinquish the opportunity to exploit the company's profits. In 1712, another act renewed the status of the company, though the debts were repaid. By 1720, 15% of British imports were from India, almost all passing through the company, which reasserted the influence of the company lobby. The licence was prolonged until 1766 by yet another act in 1730. 

At this time, Britain and France became bitter rivals. Frequent skirmishes between them took place for control of colonial possessions. In 1742, fearing the monetary consequences of a war, the British government agreed to extend the deadline for the licensed exclusive trade by the company in India until 1783, in return for a further loan of £1 million. Between 1756 and 1763, the Seven Years' War diverted the state's attention towards consolidation and defence of its territorial possessions in Europe and its colonies in North America.

The war partly took place in the Indian theater, between the company troops and the French forces. In 1757, the Law Officers of the Crown delivered the Pratt–Yorke opinion distinguishing overseas territories acquired by right of conquest from those acquired by private treaty. The opinion asserted that, while the Crown of Great Britain enjoyed sovereignty over both, only the property of the former was vested in the Crown.

With the advent of the Industrial Revolution, Britain surged ahead of its European rivals. Demand for Indian commodities was boosted by the need to sustain the troops and the economy during the war, and by the increased availability of raw materials and efficient methods of production. As home to the revolution, Britain experienced higher standards of living. Its spiralling cycle of prosperity, demand and production had a profound influence on overseas trade. The company became the single largest player in the British global market. In 1801 Henry Dundas reported to the House of Commons that

Saltpetre trade 

Sir John Banks, a businessman from Kent who negotiated an agreement between the king and the company, began his career in a syndicate arranging contracts for victualling the navy, an interest he kept up for most of his life. He knew that Samuel Pepys and John Evelyn had amassed a substantial fortune from the Levant and Indian trades.

He became a director and later, as governor of the East India Company in 1672, he arranged a contract which included a loan of £20,000 and £30,000 worth of saltpetre—also known as potassium nitrate, a primary ingredient in gunpowder—for the King "at the price it shall sell by the candle"—that is by auction—where bidding could continue as long as an inch-long candle remained alight.

Outstanding debts were also agreed and the company permitted to export 250 tons of saltpetre. Again in 1673, Banks successfully negotiated another contract for 700 tons of saltpetre at £37,000 between the king and the company. So high was the demand from armed forces that the authorities sometimes turned a blind eye on the untaxed sales. One governor of the company was even reported as saying in 1864 that he would rather have the saltpetre made than the tax on salt.

Basis for the monopoly

Colonial monopoly 

The Seven Years' War (1756–1763) resulted in the defeat of the French forces, limited French imperial ambitions, and stunted the influence of the Industrial Revolution in French territories. Robert Clive, the Governor-General, led the company to a victory against Joseph François Dupleix, the commander of the French forces in India, and recaptured Fort St George from the French. The company took this respite to seize Manila in 1762.

By the Treaty of Paris, France regained the five establishments captured by the British during the war (Pondichéry, Mahe, Karaikal, Yanam and Chandernagar) but was prevented from erecting fortifications and keeping troops in Bengal (art. XI). Elsewhere in India, the French were to remain a military threat, particularly during the War of American Independence, and up to the capture of Pondichéry in 1793 at the outset of the French Revolutionary Wars without any military presence. Although these small outposts remained French possessions for the next two hundred years, French ambitions on Indian territories were effectively laid to rest, thus eliminating a major source of economic competition for the company.

The Great Bengal famine of 1770, which was exacerbated by the actions of the East India Company, led to massive shortfalls in expected land values for the company.  The Company bore heavy losses and its stock price fell significantly. In May 1772 the EIC stock price rose significantly. In June Alexander Fordyce lost £300,000 shorting EIC stock, leaving his partners liable for an estimated £243,000 in debts. As this information became public, 20–30 banks across Europe collapsed during the British credit crisis of 1772-1773. In India alone, the company had bill debts of £1.2 million. It seems that EIC directors James Cockburn and George Colebrooke were "bulling" the Amsterdam market during 1772. The root of this crisis in relation to the East India Company came from the prediction by Isaac de Pinto that ‘peace conditions plus an abundance of money would push East Indian shares to ‘exorbitant heights.’

On 14 January 1773 the directors of the EIC asked for a government loan and unlimited access to the tea market in the American colonies, both of which were granted. In August 1773 the Bank of England assisted the EIC with a loan.

The East India Company had also been granted competitive advantages over colonial American tea importers to sell tea from its colonies in Asia in American colonies. This led to the Boston Tea Party of 1773 in which protesters boarded British ships and threw the tea overboard. When protesters successfully prevented the unloading of tea in three other colonies and in Boston, Governor Thomas Hutchinson of the Province of Massachusetts Bay refused to allow the tea to be returned to Britain. This was one of the incidents which led to the American Revolution and independence of the American colonies.

The company's trade monopoly with India was abolished in the Charter Act of 1813. The monopoly with China was ended in 1833, ending the trading activities of the company and rendering its activities purely administrative.

Disestablishment 
In the aftermath of the Indian Rebellion of 1857 and under the provisions of the Government of India Act 1858, the British Government nationalised the company. The British government took over its Indian possessions, its administrative powers and machinery, and its armed forces.

The company had already divested itself of its commercial trading assets in India in favour of the UK government in 1833, with the latter assuming the debts and obligations of the company, which were to be serviced and paid from tax revenue raised in India. In return, the shareholders voted to accept an annual dividend of 10.5%, guaranteed for forty years, likewise to be funded from India, with a final pay-off to redeem outstanding shares. The debt obligations continued beyond dissolution, and were only extinguished by the UK government during the Second World War.

The company remained in existence in vestigial form, continuing to manage the tea trade on behalf of the British Government (and the supply of Saint Helena) until the East India Stock Dividend Redemption Act 1873 came into effect, on 1 January 1874. This Act provided for the formal dissolution of the company on 1 June 1874, after a final dividend payment and the commutation or redemption of its stock. The Times commented on 8 April 1873:

Establishments in Britain 

The company's headquarters in London, from which much of India was governed, was East India House in Leadenhall Street. After occupying premises in Philpot Lane from 1600 to 1621; in Crosby House, Bishopsgate from 1621 to 1638; and in Leadenhall Street from 1638 to 1648, the company moved into Craven House, an Elizabethan mansion in Leadenhall Street. The building had become known as East India House by 1661. It was completely rebuilt and enlarged in 1726–1729 and further significantly remodelled and expanded in 1796–1800. It was finally vacated in 1860 and demolished in 1861–1862. The site is now occupied by the Lloyd's building.

In 1607, the company decided to build its own ships and leased a yard on the River Thames at Deptford. By 1614, the yard having become too small, an alternative site was acquired at Blackwall: the new yard was fully operational by 1617. It was sold in 1656, although for some years East India Company ships continued to be built and repaired there under the new owners.

In 1803 an Act of Parliament, promoted by the East India Company, established the East India Dock Company, with the aim of establishing a new set of docks (the East India Docks) primarily for the use of ships trading with India. The existing Brunswick Dock, part of the Blackwall Yard site, became the Export Dock; while a new Import Dock was built to the north. In 1838 the East India Dock Company merged with the West India Dock Company. The docks were taken over by the Port of London Authority in 1909, and closed in 1967.

The East India College was founded in 1806 as a training establishment for "writers" (i.e. clerks) in the company's service. It was initially located in Hertford Castle, but moved in 1809 to purpose-built premises at Hertford Heath, Hertfordshire. In 1858 the college closed; but in 1862 the buildings reopened as a public school, now Haileybury and Imperial Service College.

The East India Company Military Seminary was founded in 1809 at Addiscombe, near Croydon, Surrey, to train young officers for service in the company's armies in India. It was based in Addiscombe Place, an early 18th-century mansion. The government took it over in 1858, and renamed it the Royal Indian Military College. In 1861 it was closed, and the site was subsequently redeveloped.

In 1818, the company entered into an agreement by which those of its servants who were certified insane in India might be cared for at Pembroke House, Hackney, London, a private lunatic asylum run by Dr George Rees until 1838, and thereafter by Dr William Williams. The arrangement outlasted the company itself, continuing until 1870, when the India Office opened its own asylum, the Royal India Asylum, at Hanwell, Middlesex.

The East India Club in London was formed in 1849 for officers of the company. The Club still exists today as a private gentlemen's club with its club house situated at 16 St James's Square, London.

Symbols

Flags 

The English East India Company flag changed over time, with a canton based on the flag of the contemporary Kingdom, and a field of 9-to-13 alternating red and white stripes.

From 1600, the canton consisted of a St George's Cross representing the Kingdom of England. With the Acts of Union 1707, the canton was changed to the new Union Flag—consisting of an English St George's Cross combined with a Scottish St Andrew's cross—representing the Kingdom of Great Britain. After the Acts of Union 1800 that joined Ireland with Great Britain to form the United Kingdom of Great Britain and Ireland, the canton of the East India Company flag was altered accordingly to include a Saint Patrick's Saltire.

There has been much debate about the number and order of stripes in the field of the flag. Historical documents and paintings show variations from 9-to-13 stripes, with some images showing the top stripe red and others showing it white.

At the time of the American Revolution the East India Company flag was nearly identical to the Grand Union Flag. Historian Charles Fawcett argued that the East India Company Flag inspired the Stars and Stripes of America.

Coat of arms 

The East India Company's original coat of arms was granted in 1600. The blazon of the arms is as follows:
"Azure, three ships with three masts, rigged and under full sail, the sails, pennants and ensigns Argent, each charged with a cross Gules; on a chief of the second a pale quarterly Azure and Gules, on the 1st and 4th a fleur-de-lis or, on the 2nd and 3rd a leopard or, between two roses Gules seeded Or barbed Vert." The shield had as a crest: "A sphere without a frame, bounded with the Zodiac in bend Or, between two pennants flottant Argent, each charged with a cross Gules, over the sphere the words " (Latin: God Indicates).

The East India Company's later arms, granted in 1698, were: "Argent a cross Gules; in the dexter chief quarter an escutcheon of the arms of France and England quarterly, the shield ornamentally and regally crowned Or." The crest was: "A lion rampant guardant Or holding between the forepaws a regal crown proper." The supporters were: "Two lions rampant guardant Or, each supporting a banner erect Argent, charged with a cross Gules."

Merchant mark 

When the East India Company was chartered in 1600, it was still customary for individual merchants or members of companies such as the Company of Merchant Adventurers to have a distinguishing merchant's mark which often included the mystical "Sign of Four" and served as a trademark. The East India Company's merchant mark consisted of a "Sign of Four" atop a heart within which was a saltire between the lower arms of which were the initials "EIC". This mark was a central motif of the East India Company's coinage and forms the central emblem displayed on the Scinde Dawk postage stamps.

Ships 

Ships of the East India Company were called East Indiamen or simply "Indiamen".

During the French Revolutionary and Napoleonic Wars, the East India Company arranged for letters of marque for its vessels such as Lord Nelson. This was not so that they could carry cannon to fend off warships, privateers, and pirates on their voyages to India and China (that they could do without permission) but so that, should they have the opportunity to take a prize, they could do so without being guilty of piracy. Similarly, the Earl of Mornington, an East India Company packet ship of only six guns, also sailed under a letter of marque.

These vessels often accompanied vessels of the Royal Navy on expeditions, such as the Invasion of Java.

On this occasion the Indiamen succeeded in bluffing their way to safety, and without any shots even being fired. Lastly, on 15 June 1795, General Goddard played a large role in the capture of seven Dutch East Indiamen off St Helena.

East Indiamen were large and strongly built and when the Royal Navy was desperate for vessels to escort merchant convoys it bought several of them to convert to warships. Earl of Mornington became HMS Drake. Other examples include:

 
 
  (1795)
  (1804)
 
 

Their design as merchant vessels meant that their performance in the warship role was underwhelming and the Navy converted them to transports.

Records 

Unlike all other British Government records, the records from the East India Company (and its successor the India Office) are not in The National Archives at Kew, London, but are held by the British Library in London as part of the Asia, Pacific and Africa Collections. The catalogue is searchable online in the Access to Archives catalogues. Many of the East India Company records are freely available online under an agreement that the Families in British India Society has with the British Library. Published catalogues exist of East India Company ships' journals and logs, 1600–1834; and of some of the company's daughter institutions, including the East India Company College, Haileybury, and Addiscombe Military Seminary.

The Asiatic Journal and Monthly Register for British India and its Dependencies, first issued in 1816, was sponsored by the East India Company, and includes much information relating to the EIC.

Early governors
 1600–1601: Sir Thomas Smythe (first governor)
 1601–1602: Sir John Watts
 1602–1603: Sir John Harts
 1606–1607: Sir William Romney
 1607–1621: Sir Thomas Smythe
 1621–1624: Sir William Halliday
 1624–1638: Sir Maurice (Morris) Abbot
 1638–1641: Sir Christopher Clitherow

See also

East India Company
 Company rule in India
 Economy of India under Company rule
 Governor-General of India
 Chief Justice of Bengal
 Advocate-General of Bengal
 Chief Justice of Madras
 Presidency armies
 Indian Rebellion of 1857
 Indian independence movement
 List of East India Company directors
 List of trading companies
 East India Company Cemetery in Macau
 :Category:Honourable East India Company regiments

General
 British Imperial Lifeline
 Lascar
 Carnatic Wars
 Commercial Revolution
 Political warfare in British colonial India
 Trade between Western Europe and the Mughal Empire in the 17th century
 Whampoa anchorage

Notes

References

Further reading 

 
 
 ; 14 essays by scholars
 
 
 
 
 
 Collins, G. M. (2019). "The Limits of Mercantile Administration: Adam Smith and Edmund Burke on Britain's East India Company" Journal of the History of Economic Thought, 41(3), 369–392.
 Dalrymple, William (March 2015). The East India Company: The original corporate raiders . "For a century, the East India Company conquered, subjugated and plundered vast tracts of south Asia. The lessons of its brutal reign have never been more relevant." The Guardian
 William Dalrymple The Anarchy: The Relentless Rise of the East India Company, Bloomsbury, London, 2019, .
 
 
 Dodwell, Henry. Dupleix and Clive: Beginning of Empire. (1968).
 
 
 
 Furber, Holden. John Company at Work: A study of European Expansion in India in the late Eighteenth century (Harvard University Press, 1948)
 
 Gardner, Brian. The East India Company : a history (1990) Online free to borrow
 
 
 Hutková, K. (2017). "Technology transfers and organization: the English East India Company and the transfer of Piedmontese silk reeling technology to Bengal, 1750s–1790s" Enterprise & Society, 18(4), 921–951.
 
  Kumar, Deepak. (2017) The evolution of colonial science in India: natural history and the East India Company." Imperialism and the natural world (Manchester University Press, 2017).
 
 
 McAleer, John. (2017). Picturing India: People, Places, and the World of the East India Company (University of Washington Press).
 
 Marshall, P. J. Problems of Empire: Britain and India 1757–1813 (1968) Online free to borrow
 Misra, B. B. The Central Administration of the East India Company, 1773–1834  (1959)
 
 
 Oak, Mandar, and Anand V. Swamy. "Myopia or strategic behavior? Indian regimes and the East India Company in late eighteenth century India."  Explorations in economic history 49.3 (2012): 352–366.
 Philips, C. H. The East India Company 1784–1834 (2nd ed. 1961), on its internal workings.
 Raman, Bhavani. "Sovereignty, property and land development: the East India Company in Madras." Journal of the Economic and Social History of the Orient 61.5–6 (2018): 976–1004.
 Rees, L. A. (2017). Welsh sojourners in India: the East India Company, networks and patronage, c. 1760–1840. Journal of Imperial and Commonwealth History, 45(2), 165–187.
 Riddick, John F. The history of British India: a chronology  (2006), covers 1599–1947
 Riddick, John F. Who Was Who in British India (1998), covers 1599–1947
 
 
 
 Robins, Nick (December 2004). The world's first multinational , in the New Statesman
 
 
 
 St. John, Ian. The Making of the Raj: India Under the East India Company  (ABC-CLIO, 2011)
 
 Stern, Philip J. The Company-State: Corporate Sovereignty and the Early Modern Foundations of the British Empire in India  (2011)
  (also): "The East India Company in Eighteenth-Century Politics." Economic History Review 17.1 (1947): 15–26. online 
 Vaughn, J. M. (2019). The Politics of Empire at the Accession of George III: The East India Company and the Crisis and Transformation of Britain's Imperial State (Lewis Walpole Series in Eighteenth-Century Culture and History).

Historiography 
 
 
 Van Meersbergen, G. (2017). "Writing East India Company History after the Cultural Turn: Interdisciplinary Perspectives on the Seventeenth-Century East India Company and Verenigde Oostindische Compagnie." Journal for Early Modern Cultural Studies, 17(3), 10–36. online

External links 

 Charter of 1600
 
 Seals and Insignias of East India Company
 The Secret Trade The basis of the monopoly.
 Trading Places – a learning resource from the British Library
 Port Cities: History of the East India Company
 Ships of the East India Company
 Plant Cultures: East India Company in India
 History and Politics: East India Company
 Nick Robins, "The world's first multinational", 13 December 2004, New Statesman
 East India Company: Its History and Results article by Karl Marx, MECW Volume 12, p. 148 in Marxists Internet Archive
 Text of East India Company Act 1773
 Text of East India Company Act 1784
 "The East India Company – a corporate route to Europe" on BBC Radio 4's In Our Time featuring Huw Bowen, Linda Colley and Maria Misra
 HistoryMole Timeline: The British East India Company
 William Howard Hooker Collection: East Indiaman Thetis Logbook (#472-003), East Carolina Manuscript Collection, J. Y. Joyner Library, East Carolina University

 
British colonisation of Asia
British Ceylon
British Malaya
British rule in Singapore
British Indian history
Colonial Indian companies
Chartered companies
Defunct companies of England
Former monopolies
Trading companies
Trade monopolies
History of foreign trade in China
Mysorean invasion of Malabar
Defunct companies of the United Kingdom
Companies established in 1600
British companies disestablished in 1874
1600 establishments in England
1600s establishments in British India
1600 establishments in Asia
1874 disestablishments in British India
1874 disestablishments in Asia
Age of Sail